

Qualification summary

Artistic Gymnastics
Qualification for the artistic gymnastics competition will be done in teams, and is summarized below. The qualifying competition was the 2010 Pan American Championship in Guadalajara. Each nation can send a maximum of 12 athletes (6 male and 6 female).

Men

Women

There were only 11 teams that competed at the Pan American Championship, so the remaining two spots go into the individual qualification.
Cuba decided to send only four out of six athletes qualified. Panama also withdrew its athlete. Bolivia was given a wildcard to enter the competition.

Rhythmic Gymnastics
Qualification for the rhythmic gymnastics competition will be done in teams, and is summarized below. The qualifying competition was the 2010 Pan American Championship in Guadalajara. Each nation can send a maximum of 8 athletes.

Individual

* The top 6 countries in the group competition (see below) will qualify 2 athletes each. The remaining 4 places are given to countries not already qualified with a maximum of one gymnast per country.

** Mexico qualified two spots, but was stripped when one athlete tested positive for drug usage. Argentina the next best placed country was upgraded to send two athletes.

Group
Each country qualifying a group can enter 6 athletes each.

Trampoline
There is a quota of 16 athletes (8 male and 8 female). The top three overall teams at the 2010 Pan American Championship will qualify 2 athletes each while, places four and five will qualify one athlete each.

Men

Women

References 

P
Qualification for the 2011 Pan American Games
Gymnastics at the 2011 Pan American Games